Alfonso Fraga Pérez (born 1941 in Havana) is a Cuban attorney and diplomat.

He has been the Secretary General of the Organization of Solidarity with the People of Asia, Africa and Latin America since 2006.  He was the Cuban ambassador to Chile from 2000 to 2006, and the Chief of the Cuban Interests Section in Washington, D.C. from 1992 to 1998.  He has also worked in Cuban embassies in Yugoslavia, China, Poland, East Germany and Zimbabwe. He served as the head of the Cuban Foreign Ministry's European Department.

He is married to Isolina Elisa Gómez Rodríguez (born 1942) and has three children, Alfonso, Rosario, and Leonor Fraga Gómez and five grandchildren. He is the brother-in-law of the Cuban writer and attorney, Clemente Guillermo Gómez Rodríguez.

References

 Te Van A Fusilar; Talleres de Rhodes Printing 2007,  
 Ex-Foreign Diplomat Sent By Cuba To DC, The Miami Herald, October 3, 1992, Page 21A
 Article in Cuba Va 

1941 births
Living people
Cuban diplomats
Ambassadors of Cuba to the United States
Ambassadors of Cuba to Chile
20th-century Cuban lawyers
Government ministers of Cuba